Meghraj Jain (13 May 1943) is a Bharatiya Janata Party (BJP) politician and former RSS Pracharak. He is a Member of Parliament, representing Madhya Pradesh in the Rajya Sabha the upper house of Indian Parliament. He was elected in a Rajya Sabha bye election in  2014  to replace Kaptan Singh Solanki  who resigned to become the Governor of Haryana.

References

External links
Meghraj Jain Rajya Sabha Profile

Bharatiya Janata Party politicians from Madhya Pradesh
1943 births
Living people
Rajya Sabha members from Madhya Pradesh
People from Mandsaur district
Rajya Sabha members from the Bharatiya Janata Party